The Esch-sur-Sûre Dam is an arch dam on the River Sauer just upstream of Esch-sur-Sûre in the Wiltz canton of Luxembourg. The primary purpose of the dam and its reservoir, Upper Sûre Lake, is to provide municipal water supply and hydroelectric power generation. The dam is operated jointly by the Administration of Roads and Bridges and the Syndicate des Eaux du Barrage d'Esch-sur-Sûre (SEBES) while the power station is operated by Société Electrique de l'Our (SEO).

Background
It was first conceived in the 1950s to help replace nature groundwater resources for the town of Esch-sur-Sûre. Using an André Coyne design, the dam was constructed between 1956 and 1957 and the power station was commissioned in 1963. The reservoir has been drained twice during the dam's life; once in 1969 to install a new fixed water intake and again in 1991 to install and adjustable-arm intake which mitigate issues with algae growth in the reservoir.

Dam

Power station
The power station at the base of the dam contains two 5.5 MW Francis turbine-generators for a total installed capacity of 11 MW. The power station generates an average of 16 GWh annually. Downstream of the dam there are three weirs fitted with Kaplan turbines with a total installed capacity of 550 kW.

Spillway plans
The dam also provides for flood control but has no spillway. Currently, two bottom outlets with a  discharge capacity pass floods through the reservoir. Floods in the 1990s highlighted the need for a spillway at the dam. A design for a chute spillway on the left abutment of the dam have been drafted but not implemented.

See also

Vianden Pumped Storage Plant

References

Dams in Luxembourg
Dams completed in 1957
Energy infrastructure completed in 1963
Arch dams
Wiltz (canton)
Hydroelectric power stations in Luxembourg